The River Itchen may refer to:

 River Itchen, Hampshire, England
 River Itchen, Warwickshire, England